Govinda Nagar is a village in the Nicobar district of Andaman and Nicobar Islands, India. It is located in the Great Nicobar tehsil. It was developed as a tsunami shelter to house people displaced by the 2004 Indian Ocean earthquake and tsunami. 

In 2012, a new bird named "Great Nicobar Crake" belonging to the genus Rallina was discovered at the Govinda Nagar tsunami shelter by Zoological Survey of India scientists.

Demographics 

According to the 2011 census of India, Govinda Nagar has 194 households. The effective literacy rate (i.e. the literacy rate of population excluding children aged 6 and below) is 81.88%.

References 

Villages in Great Nicobar tehsil